Chloe Melisande Hooper (born 1973) is an Australian author.

Her first novel, A Child’s Book of True Crime (2002), was short-listed for the Orange Prize for Literature and was a New York Times Notable Book.  In 2005, she turned to reportage and the next year won a Walkley Award for her writing on the 2004 Palm Island death in custody case. The Tall Man: Death and Life on Palm Island (2008) is a non-fiction account of the same case. Her 2019 book, The Arsonist: A Mind on Fire, published in the United States by Seven Stories Press in 2020, investigates the Black Saturday bushfires, one of the most devastating wildfires in Australian history.

Books
 A Child's Book of True Crime (2002)
 The Tall Man: Death and Life on Palm Island (2008) (released as Tall Man: The Death of Doomadgee in the USA)
 The Engagement (2012)
 The Arsonist: A Mind on Fire (2019)
 Bedtime Story (2022)

Awards and recognition
Hooper was a recipient of a Sidney Myer Creative Fellowship, an award of  given to mid-career creatives and thought leaders.
Shortlisted 2002 Orange Prize. for (A Child's Book of True Crime)
Winner 2006 Walkley Award.  for her articles in The Monthly on the death in custody of Cameron Doomadgee on Palm Island.
Winner 2008 Western Australian Premier's Book Awards, Award for Non-Fiction category, for Tall Man
Winner 2008 Western Australian Premier's Book Awards for Book of the Year, for Tall Man
Winner 2009 New South Wales Premier's Literary Awards.  Won the Douglas Stewart Prize for Non-fiction for the Tall Man
Winner 2009 Victorian Premier's Literary Award Nettie Palmer Prize for Non-fiction for Tall Man
Winner 2009 Australian Book Industry Awards for General Non-fiction for Tall Man
Winner 2009 John Button Prize for Writing for Young Adults for Tall Man
Winner 2009 Queensland Premier's Literary Non-Fiction Book Award for Tall Man
Winner 2009 Indie Award for Non-fiction for Tall Man
Winner 2009 Ned Kelly Awards for Best True Crime for Tall Man
Winner 2009 Davitt Awards for Best True Crime for Tall Man
Shortlisted 2008 Human Rights Award for Non-fiction for Tall Man
Shortlisted 2008 Walkley Award for Non-fiction for Tall Man
Shortlisted 2009 Australian Book Industry Awards for Book of the Year for Tall Man
Shortlisted 2009 Queensland Premier's Award for Advancing Public Debate for Tall Man
Shortlisted 2009 NSW Premier's Literary Awards for Gleebooks for Tall Man
Shortlisted 2009 Prime Minister's Literary Award for Non-fiction for Tall Man
Shortlisted 2019 Victorian Premier's Prize for Nonfiction for The Arsonist
Longlisted 2019 Stella Prize

References

External links
 The Tall Man: Death and Life on Palm Island
 Items by Chloe Hooper in The Monthly
 Chloe Hooper discusses her book 'The Tall Man' at the Sydney Writers Festival video on ABC Fora

1973 births
Living people
Australian women novelists
Ned Kelly Award winners
21st-century Australian novelists
21st-century Australian women writers
Walkley Award winners
University of Melbourne alumni
Columbia University School of the Arts alumni
21st-century non-fiction writers
Australian non-fiction crime writers
Australian crime fiction writers
People educated at Lauriston Girls' School
Fulbright alumni